Jerry L. Demings (born June 12, 1959) is an American politician and former law enforcement officer serving as Mayor of Orange County, Florida, in office since 2018. A Democrat, he previously served as Sheriff of Orange County, Florida, from 2009 to December 2018, and served as Chief of the Orlando Police Department and Director of Public Safety for Orange County, Florida. He was elected Mayor of Orange County in August 2018, becoming the first Democrat and first African American to be elected to that office.

Early life and education
Demings was born and raised in Orlando, Florida, the youngest of five children. His father was a taxi driver and his mother a homemaker. One of his brothers died of heroin addiction. He graduated from Jones High School in Orlando and later attended Florida State University and Everest College, earning a bachelor's degree in finance and master's degree in business administration. He also has a certificate of completion from Harvard University's Kennedy School, FBI National Academy and FBI National Executive Institute.

Career
Demings worked as an accountant before beginning a career in law enforcement.
Demings joined the Orlando Police Department in 1981 after certification from the J. C. Stone Memorial Police Academy. He worked in the department as a detective before he became its first African-American chief in 1998, serving until his retirement after 21 years with the department in 2002. In 2002, he was named Director of Public Safety for Orange County, a position in which he served until 2008. In 2008, Demings ran as the Democratic candidate for Sheriff of Orange County, Florida, the chief law enforcement officer of the county. He defeated his Republican challenger John B. Tegg III, and became the first African-American to serve in the post. Demings was re-elected in 2012, and again in 2016. In July 2016, Demings was elected as president of the Florida Sheriffs' Association.

When Demings was elected county Sheriff in 2008, his wife, Val Demings, held his former job as Chief of the Orlando Police Department. Demings' Republican opponent in the Sheriff's race, John Tegg, alleged that his election would create a conflict of interest.

In April 2022, Demings spoke out against the repeal of the Reedy Creek Improvement Act, saying that the Florida legislature had not "adequately contemplated the ramifications" and said it would put an "undue burden" on taxpayers.

Personal life
Demings is married to former U.S. Representative Val Demings, whom he met during his early years with the Orlando Police Department. He was a detective and she was a first-year police officer when they both worked a juvenile go-kart-accident case. They married in 1988 and have three children along with five grandchildren. His wife served as a captain in the police department while he was chief and later went on to become the first female police chief of the Orlando Police Department, serving from 2007 to 2011. She was elected to the United States House of Representatives in 2016.

References

External links

|-

Living people
1959 births
African-American mayors in Florida
African-American sheriffs
Florida sheriffs
Florida Democrats
Jones High School (Orlando, Florida) alumni
People from Orange County, Florida
Chiefs of the Orlando Police Department
21st-century African-American people
20th-century African-American people